Mesmerized (also known as Shocked and My Letter to George) is a 1985 drama film directed by Michael Laughlin and starring Jodie Foster, John Lithgow and Michael Murphy.

Loosely based upon the Pimlico mystery, the film was a co-production between Australia, New Zealand, United Kingdom and United States with RKO Pictures. The film was titled Mesmerized during production and upon release in Australia, New Zealand, and the UK. It was released in the US in 1986 as My Letter to George, and elsewhere as Shocked.

Plot
An orphaned 18-year-old New Zealand girl marries a much older wealthy businessman. Strains soon develop between them, at great emotional and physical toll on them and those around them, from family and servants, to business and trade associates and clientele.

She proceeds to cultivate a game with him in which she reads to him and also hypnotizes him. While he is under hypnosis she feeds him chloroform, thus gradually poisoning him. He finally dies and she is arrested and accused of poisoning him. Although chloroform is found in his stomach, there is no proof that she was involved, so she is acquitted. She then leaves New Zealand with his brother George, whom she loves.

The film ends by stating that her story was "based on a real character, crime and trial" and that it was assumed that they had emigrated to America to begin a new life. She was 19 years old.

Cast
 Jodie Foster – Victoria Thompson
 John Lithgow – Oliver Thompson
 Michael Murphy – Wilson
 Dan Shor – George Thompson
 Harry Andrews – Old Thompson
 Philip Holder – Dr. Finch
 Beryl Te Wiata – Mrs. Simmons
 Reg Evans – Mr. Simmons
 Jonathan Hardy – Burley
 Don Selwyn – Joseph
 Derek Hardwick – Longwood
 George Spoors – Lawyer
 Bob Gould – Judge
 Jonathan Elsom – Public Prosecutor
 Norman Fairley – Bailiff

References

External links

1985 films
Australian drama films
New Zealand drama films
Films scored by Georges Delerue
Films directed by Michael Laughlin
1985 drama films
British drama films
Films with screenplays by Michael Laughlin
1980s English-language films
1980s British films
1980s Australian films